Mick Jagger is a British recording artist most well known for his association with the Rolling Stones and his songwriting partner in the group, Keith Richards; their partnership is considered one of the most successful in history. As a solo artist he has released four solo albums, one collaborative album, one collaborative soundtrack album, as well as twenty-two singles, a number of them containing non-album tracks.

Studio

Albums

Soundtrack albums

Singles
 "—" denotes releases did not chart.

Other appearances

Compilation

Guest appearances

Feature singles 
 "—" denotes releases did not chart.

References 

Discographies of British artists
Rock music discographies